A Long Walk to Water is a short novel written by Linda Sue Park and published in 2010. It blends the true story of Salva Dut whose story is based in 1985, a part of the Dinka tribe and a Sudanese Lost Boy, and the fictional story of Nya whose story is based in 2008, a young village girl that was a part of the Nuer tribe. Park used this book as a platform to support Dut's organization, Water for South Sudan.

Characters

Salva Dut
Salva Dut was separated from his family during a civil war in what is now South Sudan. He has to walk for weeks, hoping that one day he will find his family again. Salva also struggles to find food and water to survive along with avoiding rebels, lions and other threats. Salva leads one thousand five hundred fellow lost boys to a refugee camp near the Gilo River. On his way, many people die including his uncle and some of his friends. Seven years later, he arrives in America. He lives with a family in Rochester, New York. Years later, he finds his father who tells him that most of his family survived. Hearing that, Salva starts a volunteer group to build wells in South Sudan called "Water for South Sudan". He helps others in need of clean water in South Sudan.

Nya
Nya is an 11-year-old girl who walks eight hours to fetch water from the pond. She and her family live in South Sudan in 2008. Her family home is far from the nearest pond, where she walks twice a day to support her parents and younger sister, Akeer. She also has a little brother that her mom takes care of at home. Throughout the story, her sister, Akeer, gets sick and told that the water was contaminated. Later in 2009, a well is built in her village so she will not have to walk so far and drink unsafe water. A school is built along with the well and Nya is overjoyed by this. She then introduces herself to Salva Dut at the end of the book, because she was confused by the fact that Salva, a Dinka would help her Nuer village.

Water for South Sudan
Water for South Sudan is a non-profit organization created by Salva Dut which drills wells for villages in South Sudan.

Reception
A Long Walk to Water has received generally positive reviews from critics.

On Common Sense Media, Kate Pavao rated the book five stars. Pavao praised the book for Salva's courage and perseverance through his struggles. Reviewing the book for The Newcastle Herald, Stacey Dombkins praised Park's execution of the dual narrative, stating that the book's "unsurprising but very satisfying ending" successfully shows how Salva's hope and determination brought positive changes to those residing in Sudan.

References

2010 American novels
2010 children's books
American children's novels
Novels by Linda Sue Park
South Sudanese culture
Novels set in Sudan
Lost Boys of Sudan
Clarion Books books